Hlatshwayo is a South African surname that may refer to
Isaac Hlatshwayo (born 1977), South African professional boxer
Thulani Hlatshwayo (born 1989), South African football defender

See also
Hlatshwayo v Hein, a 1998 case in South African law

Surnames of African origin